William John Bragg (July 23, 1858 – June 27, 1941) was an Ontario farmer and political figure. He represented Durham in the Legislative Assembly of Ontario from 1919 to 1937 as a Liberal member.

Biography
He was born in Darlington Township, Canada West, the son of Richard Bragg. In 1884, he married Sarah Somers. Bragg was a director of the Farmer's Dairy of Toronto and of a silver mine. He was manager for the Bowmanville Fruit Growers Association.

He died after he was struck and run over by a horse-drawn milk wagon in Toronto, in 1941.

References

External links 

1858 births
1941 deaths
Canadian Methodists
Ontario Liberal Party MPPs